is a Japanese chef and owner of Sukiyabashi Jiro, a Japanese sushi restaurant in Ginza, Chūō, Tokyo, Japan. Ono is regarded by his contemporaries as one of the greatest living sushi craftsmen and is credited with innovating methods used in modern sushi preparation.

Early years
Ono was born in the city of Tenryū (present-day Hamamatsu) in Shizuoka Prefecture, Japan. He started working at a local restaurant from the age of seven, before moving to Tokyo to study as an apprentice. He became a qualified sushi chef in 1951, and in 1965 opened his own restaurant, in Ginza, Tokyo.

Personal life
Ono has two sons, Yoshikazu and Takashi Ono, both of whom are also sushi chefs. Takashi, the younger son, manages his own Michelin-starred restaurant. Jiro Ono was the subject of David Gelb's 2011 documentary film Jiro Dreams of Sushi. The Onos fear that overfishing will cause key ingredients used in traditional sushi to disappear.

Ono has served former Japanese Prime Minister Shinzo Abe and United States President Barack Obama at Sukiyabashi Jiro. Obama stated, "I was born in Hawaii and ate a lot of sushi, but this was the best sushi I've ever had in my life."

Explanatory notes

References

1925 births
Head chefs of Michelin starred restaurants
Japanese chefs
Living people
People from Shizuoka Prefecture
Sushi